Alexander Levin may refer to:

 Aleksandr Levin (1871–1929), Russian chess master
 Alexander (Aaron) Levin  (born 1968), Ukrainian American businessman, philanthropist and president of Kyiv Jewish Community